Wallbank is a topographical surname of British origin, which was in use in Lancashire by the 13th century, and meant a person who lived by the bank of a stream or river.  Alternative spellings including de Wallbank, Walbank, Walbanks, and Wallbanks. The name may refer to:

Allan Wallbank (born 1937), New Zealand politician
F. W. Walbank (1909–2008), British historian
Fred Wallbanks (1908–1948), British football player
Horace Wallbanks, English footballer
John Wallbanks (1905–1987), British football player
Matthew W. Walbank (1824–1874), Canadian politician
Newell Smith Wallbank (1875–1945), British composer 
Paul Wallbank (born 1962), Australian writer
Phyllis Wallbank (born 1918), British educator
T. Walter Wallbank (1901–1992), American historian

References

Surnames of British Isles origin